The Flying Doctors is an Australian drama TV series produced by Crawford Productions that revolves around the everyday lifesaving efforts of the Royal Flying Doctor Service of Australia, starring Andrew McFarlane as the newly arrived Dr. Tom Callaghan. The popular series ran for nine seasons and was successfully screened internationally.

It was initially a 1985 mini-series based in the fictional outback town of Cooper's Crossing (set in the real life town of Minyip in north-western rural Victoria). The success of the mini-series led to its return the following year as an ongoing series with McFarlane being joined by a new doctor, Chris Randall, played by Liz Burch. McFarlane left during the first season, and actor Robert Grubb arrived as new doctor Geoff Standish. McFarlane later returned to the series, resuming his role.

The series' episodes were mostly self-contained and about medical items. The Australian society was mirrored in handling more or less controversial social problems as the abuse of women within marriage, alcohol abuse, and the position of the aboriginals. It also featured ongoing storylines, such as Dr. Standish's romance with Sister Kate Wellings (Lenore Smith). Other major characters included pilot Sam Patterson (Peter O'Brien), mechanic Emma Plimpton (Rebecca Gibney), local policeman Sgt. Jack Carruthers (Terry Gill) and Vic and Nancy Buckley (Maurie Fields and Val Jellay), who ran The Majestic, a local pub/hotel.

Cast and characters

Medical personnel
 Andrew McFarlane as Tom Callaghan, a young male doctor who takes over the R.F.D.S base in Coopers Crossing after proving himself to the original boss of the base, Harry Sinclair. He brings along Chris Randall, who is also a doctor, as his assistant. In episode sixteen Tom leaves the base, volunteering for World Vision in Africa. He returns in episode 113, staying until episode 156 although he remained in the intro credits for the rest of the season. Tom makes a final appearance in episode 201 when there is a town celebration in Coopers Crossing.
 Liz Burch as Chris Randall, a female doctor who comes along with Tom Callaghan to run the R.F.D.S base in Cooper Crossing. When Tom leaves for Africa she decides to stay in Coopers Crossing, remaining until episode 146, when she moves to Melbourne to take care of her sick father. Returns in episode 201 for the town celebration, and falls in love with Tom Callaghan again. She decides to join Tom in Africa.
 Robert Grubb as Geoff Standish, who makes his first appearance in episode 17 when he takes over the R.F.D.S base from Tom Callaghan. Geoff is one of the longest-running characters in the series, and stayed until the end. His relationship with Nurse Kate Wellings was a key storyline. They have one daughter in the end of the series.
 Brett Climo as David Ratcliffe. A young doctor who joins the staff in episode 101 and stays until episode 171 when he decides to leave to do something else with his life. However, after a final rescue mission goes terribly wrong, he dies in a climbing accident when he falls down a cliff.
 Sarah Chadwick as Rosie 'Rowie' Lang. She makes her first appearance in "Swinging on the Rope", when she returns to Cooper's Crossing after leaving as a teenager to attend Medical School at the University of Sydney. Dr. Lang is the replacement for Dr. Radcliffe. She is a headstrong, determined woman, applying for a position with the RFDS to confront childhood bullies, and show them that "being a Lang doesn't mean being a loser", after having grown up as the youngest of 6 children (and the only girl), of alcoholic, neglectful parents. Despite her late arrival, Sarah is given a rich character-profile, the series featuring episodes in which both her older brother Frank and her father Alf appear. She attracts romantic interest from Captain Johnno Johnson and eventually accepts his proposal of marriage. On the day of the wedding she realises she is marrying Johnno to make up for the less than ideal marriage her mother experienced. Rosie calls off the wedding as the RFDS cars are proceeding to the airstrip where the guests are waiting for the service. She resigns in the last episode.
 Lenore Smith as Kate Wellings / Standish. She makes her first appearance in the mini-series. The only medical staff who stayed through the entire show.
David Reyne as Dr. Guy Reid. A charming womaniser that arrives in episode 167 and soon begins a relationship with the nurse Jackie Crane. Stays until the end.
Melita Jurisic as Dr. Magda Heller. A young doctor from Germany that arrives in episode 159 and stays until episode 178

Pilots
 Lewis Fitz-Gerald as David 'Gibbo' Gibson. Dies from complications of injuries he sustained in a plane crash.
 Peter O'Brien as Sam Patterson. He makes his first appearance in "Good Day For It", as a replacement for Gibbo.
 Christopher Stollery as Johnno Johnson.
 Justin Gaffney as Gerry O'Neill. (Season 6)
 Louise Siversen as Debbie O'Brien. She fills in every now and then. Loses her flight certificate after she faints during a flight because of a concussion and is never seen again after that.

Call signs
One prominent feature in the show is the communication between the aircraft and the base station in Cooper's Crossing. Their designations are spelled out using the NATO phonetic alphabet.
 MSF, or Mike Sierra Foxtrot, is the aircraft, a GAF Nomad carrying registration VH-MSF (the show's producers were probably very clever in the choice of the letters 'MSF' for the aircraft, because 'MSF' is short for Médecins Sans Frontières ["Doctors Without Borders"], the international medical charitable organisation).
 VCC, or Victor Charlie Charlie, is the RFDS base at Coopers Crossing.

Home media

The Flying Doctors was made available to purchase in Australia. All 221 episodes plus the 13 spinoff-episodes are on a 51 disc set, complete with cast interviews, episode synopses and stills gallery. In region 2, Mediumrare Entertainment have released all nine seasons of The Flying Doctors including the miniseries also called The Flying Doctors in region 2.

R.F.D.S.
By 1993, the ratings were in decline, and few original characters remained in the much-changed cast. To revamp the show, the setting was changed to Broken Hill, the name changed to R.F.D.S., and of the cast only original cast members Fields and Jellay were retained in the show as well as Sophie Lee as Penny Wellings. The storyline had their characters, formerly publicans at the Cooper's Crossing pub, moving to Broken Hill. The show lasted just one season in this new incarnation.

Australian pay-TV channel FOX Classics secured the rights to the program from 3 July 2006.

The Flying Doctors briefly returned to free to air when WIN Television, parent company of Crawford Productions commenced reruns of the program on 17 August 2007 at midday on weekdays.

International broadcasts
The Flying Doctors was successfully broadcast in the UK. The original 1985 3-part mini-series was aired three times on Channel 4; first in 1985, a repeat the following year from 30 May 1986 at 10:25. A third repeat aired in 1988.

The ongoing series then broadcast on BBC 1. The series initially aired on Fridays at 20:10 from 1 July 1988. On 20 August 1988, the series was moved to a Saturday early evening slot at around 17:15 where it gained a loyal audience of about 6 to 8 million viewers, until 24 August 1991. During the summer of 1992, episodes were repeated Monday to Friday at 11:05, around 8 weeks worth.

From September 1992, the series settled into a new regular Friday afternoon slot, usually at around 14:30. The BBC concluded Series 9 in spring 1996 but continued to air repeats in various slots until January 1997.

The Flying Doctors was also broadcast on the satellite and cable channel UK Gold. The channel repeated all 221 episodes weekdays at 15:00 from 1998.

The series was also aired in some parts of Europe and was particularly popular in the Netherlands where it aired on VARA at 8pm on Saturday nights from 1987 to 1993. The series aired in Ireland on RTÉ One from 1988 to 1996.
The series aired in Germany in the early 90s on state broadcaster ZDF.
The series aired originally in Sweden and has been re-broadcast on TV4 Guld in 2017 with back to back episodes on weekdays.

The show also aired in New Zealand on TVNZ, where the entire series was shown in primetime, and was very popular.

From 1988 to 1992, it was broadcast in Nigeria by the Nigerian Television Authority (NTA) Channel 5.

Filming locations

The series was filmed at:
Nulla Station, New South Wales
Cranbourne, Victoria (Royal Botanic Gardens Cranbourne)
Pearcedale, Victoria
Minyip, Victoria
Broken Hill, New South Wales
Lancefield, Victoria
RAAF Base Point Cook

See also
List of The Flying Doctors episodes
List of Australian television series
List of Nine Network programs

References

External links

The Flying Doctors at the National Film and Sound Archive
The Flying Doctors - "Public Property" at Australian Screen Online

Nine Network original programming
1986 Australian television series debuts
1993 Australian television series endings
1980s Australian television miniseries
Australian medical television series
Australian drama television series
Aviation television series
Television shows set in New South Wales
Television shows set in Victoria (Australia)
Television series by Crawford Productions
English-language television shows
1990s Australian television miniseries
Royal Flying Doctor Service of Australia